John Allan Farrington (born 2 July 1942) is a former long-distance runner from Australia, who represented his native country in the men's marathon at the 1968 Summer Olympics. There he finished in 43rd position, clocking 2:50:16.8. He came in fifth in the same event at the 1974 Commonwealth Games. Farrington claimed four national titles in the marathon (1969, 1970, 1974, and 1975).

His PR in the marathon came at the 1973 New South Wales Championships in which he ran 2:11:12.6, which was the fastest marathon in the world that year. In the 1972 Fukuoka Marathon, he finished in second place behind Frank Shorter with a 2:12:00.4 performance. He placed second behind Derek Clayton at the 1971 Australian Championship, running 2:12:14.

Excluding the 1977 Choysa Marathon in New Zealand which was a short course, Farrington ran 14 marathons in under 2 hours, 20 minutes, the world class standard of that time. He won 11 marathons overall in his career.

Achievements

References
 
 

1942 births
Living people
Place of birth missing (living people)
Australian male marathon runners
Australian male long-distance runners
Athletes (track and field) at the 1968 Summer Olympics
Olympic athletes of Australia
Athletes (track and field) at the 1974 British Commonwealth Games
Commonwealth Games competitors for Australia
20th-century Australian people
21st-century Australian people